Geraardsbergen is a city and municipality located in the Denderstreek and in the Flemish Ardennes, the hilly southern part of the Belgian province of East Flanders. The municipality comprises the city of Geraardsbergen proper and the following towns:

In 2021, Geraardsbergen had a total population of 33,970. The total area is 79.71 km².

The current mayor of Geraardsbergen is Guido De Padt, from the (liberal) party Open VLD.

History

Geraardsbergen is one of the oldest cities in Belgium. It came into existence close to the settlement of Hunnegem and in 1068 was one of the first communities in Western Europe to be granted city status.

The city was destroyed in 1381 by Walter IV of Enghien and his troops. According to legend, during the siege local people threw some of their left over food over the city wall to show that they had sufficient food to survive a long siege. This bravado notwithstanding, the city was still captured by Enghien's troops. Every year the city organizes the krakelingenworp carnival on top of the hill at Oudenberg to celebrate this historical event.

On 29May 1815, shortly before the Battle of Waterloo, Wellington and Blücher reviewed the Allied cavalry here. Some 6,000 troops were paraded in meadows on the banks of the Dender between Geraardsbergen and Jedeghem.<ref>Cavalié Mercer, Journal of the Waterloo Campaign Kept throughout the Campaign of 1815, Da Capo Press, 1995</ref>

Places of interest
Manneken Pis, the oldest such statue, older than the more famous one in Brussels.
The wall, a steep street paved with cobblestones, climbed every year by cyclists during the Tour of Flanders.Boelare Castle, seat of the former feudal domain Land (Barony) of Boelare.Overboelare Airfield, small glider airfield with a Douglas C-54A Skymaster (DC-4) as gate guard.

Mattentaart

This is made with matten paste or cheese curd.

The mattentaart'' was granted Protected Geographical Indication status by the European Union in 2006, indicating they can only be made in Geraardsbergen or in the nearby municipality of Lierde.

Notable individuals
 (1116–1196)
William of Moerbeke (1215–1286), first translator of Aristotle's works into Latin
 (1415–1460), scrivenist and scribe

Gabriël Grupello (1644-1730), Flemish Baroque sculptor 
 Frans Rens (1805-1874), Flemish scholar, active in the Flemish Movement
Robert de Foy (1893–1960), Belgian magistrate, and head of the Belgian State Security Service
 Frans Van Coetsem (1919-2002), Belgian-born linguist and university teachers (Leuven, Leiden and Cornell )
 Cyriel Delannoit (1926-1998), boxer, European champion 1948
Paul Van den Berghe (born 1933), Belgium Bishop in the Roman Catholic Church
 Ferdi Van Den Haute (born 1952), cyclist
 Guido De Padt (born 1954), politician
 Jan Callebaut (born 1955), communication and marketing advisor and entrepreneur
 Marie-Christine Deurbroeck (born 1957), long-distance runner
 Michaël Borremans (born 1963), painter and filmmaker
 Alain Van Den Bossche (born 1965), cyclist
 Dean Delannoit (born 1989), singer
  (1893–1949), painter

References

External links

 
Sightseeing in Geraardsbergen 
The historical city Geraardsbergen 

Municipalities of East Flanders
Populated places in East Flanders